is a Philippine television sketch comedy show broadcast by Q. Hosted by Jose Manalo and Wally Bayola, it premiered on December 5, 2005. The show concluded on August 6, 2007 with a total of 88 episodes.

Hosts
Jose Manalo
Wally Bayola

Co-hosts
Sugar Mercado
Gladys Guevarra
The Papa Bears
Michael 'Mitoy' Yonting
Dax Martin
Duane Lao
RJ Cruz

2005 Philippine television series debuts
2007 Philippine television series endings
Filipino-language television shows
Philippine comedy television series
Q (TV network) original programming